The 2018 Under-19 Asia Cup was the 7th edition of ACC Under-19 Cup. The cricket tournament was held in Bangladesh from 29 September to 7 October at Chittagong and Cox's Bazar. 8 teams participated in the tournament, including 5 full members and three qualifiers. Afghanistan were the defending champions but failed to defend their title after a loss against Sri Lanka in the semi-finals. India defeated Sri Lanka by 144 runs in the final to win the tournament for the 6th time.

Teams

Squads

Matches

Pool A

Points table

Pool B

Points table

Semi-finals

Final

Final standings

References

Asian Cricket Council competitions